Grigoryevo is a rural locality (a selo) and the administrative center of Grigoryevskoye Rural Settlement, Gus-Khrustalny District, Vladimir Oblast, Russia. The population was 586 as of 2010. There are 6 streets.

Geography 
Grigoryevo is located 33 km southeast of Gus-Khrustalny (the district's administrative centre) by road. Zakolpye is the nearest rural locality.

References 

Rural localities in Gus-Khrustalny District